The Army of the Republic of Bosnia and Herzegovina (or ARBiH), often referred to as Bosnian Army, was the military force of the Republic of Bosnia and Herzegovina. It was established by the government of Bosnia and Herzegovina in 1992 following the outbreak of the Bosnian War. 

Following the end of the war, and the signing of the Dayton Peace Agreement in 1995, it was transformed into the Army of the Federation of Bosnia and Herzegovina. The ARBiH was the only military force on the territory of Bosnia and Herzegovina recognised as legal by other governments. Under the State Defense Reform Law the Armed Forces of Bosnia and Herzegovina were unified into a single structure, the Armed Forces of Bosnia and Herzegovina (OSBiH), making entity armies defunct.

History

Creation and composition 
The Army of Republic of Bosnia and Herzegovina was formed on 15 April 1992 during the early days of the Bosnian War. Before the ARBiH was officially created, a number of paramilitary and civil defense groups were established. The Patriotic League (PL) and the local Territorial Defence Force of the Republic of Bosnia and Herzegovina (TORBiH) were the official army while paramilitaries such as the Zelene Beretke (Green Berets) and Crni Labudovi (Black Swans) units were also active. Other irregular groups included Bosnian mafia groups, as well as collections of police and former Yugoslav People's Army soldiers.

The army was formed in poor circumstances and suffered from a very limited supply of arms. Critical deficiencies included tanks and other heavy weaponry. The first commander of the army was Sefer Halilović.

1992
In 1992, the ARBiH was losing most of the battles and consequently, 70% of Bosnia and Herzegovina was under Yugoslav People's Army (JNA), later Bosnian Serb army (VRS), control. Sarajevo was under siege. The ARBiH had defended Sarajevo with light weaponry. The army was surrounded and the transfer of supplies was hard, if not impossible. However, ARBiH forces within the Bihac pocket were steadily defending the territory despite being surrounded by hostile forces.

1993
1993 saw no major changes in the front lines against Serbs. Instead, this year marked the start of the Croat–Bosniak War in Central Bosnia and in Herzegovina, notably the Mostar region. Pressured and contained by heavily armed Serb forces in Bosnia-Hercegovina and Croatia, the ethnic Croat militia forces – the Croatian Defence Council (HVO) – shifted their focus from defending their parts of Bosnia from Serbs to trying to capture remaining territory held by the Bosnian Army. It is widely believed that this was due to the 1991 Milošević–Tuđman Karađorđevo meeting where presidents Slobodan Milošević and Franjo Tuđman discussed partitioning Bosnia between Croatia and Serbia. In order to accomplish this, the Croatian forces would have to defeat the Bosnian Army, since the territory that they wanted was under Bosnian government control. The HVO with great engagement from the military of the Republic of Croatia and material support from Serbs, attacked Bosniak civilian population in Herzegovina and in central Bosnia starting an ethnic cleansing of Bosniak populated territories, such as in the Lašva Valley ethnic cleansing.

Vastly under-equipped Bosnian forces, fighting on two fronts, were able to repel Croats and gain territory against them on every front. At this time, due to its geographic position, Bosnia was surrounded by Croat and Serb forces from all sides. There was no way to import weapons or food. What saved Bosnia at this time was its vast industrial complex (steel and other heavy industry), which was able to switch to military production. After a short but bloody war, and once Croats realized that their partnership with Serbs would not bring them any territorial gains, they agreed to the U.S. leadership's  "Washington Treaty" peace agreement. From that point on, Croat and Bosnian government forces fought as allies against Serbs.

1994
A renewed alliance between the HVO and the ARBiH was agreed upon, with the objective of forming a strong force that could fight the much stronger and better equipped VRS. This was the time of frequent peace negotiations.

1995
Despite the loss of several enclaves, notably Srebrenica, 1995 was marked by HVO and ARBiH offensives and later by NATO intervention. Following the Split Agreement, the Croatian Army, with cooperation from the ARBiH and the HVO, launched a series of operations: Flash, Summer '95, Storm and Mistral 2. In conjunction, Bosnian forces launched operations like Sana. Bosnian and Croat armies were on the offensive in this phase.

From August to December 1995, Serb forces were defeated and driven out of the majority of Croatia and western Bosnia, and the ethnic Serb population fled from these parts.

Following the second Markale massacre, a NATO intervention was launched, which destroyed much of the VRS' infrastructure in just a few days through Operation Deliberate Force. The war ended with the signing of the Dayton Accord.

Army organization and commanding officers

Pre-Centralization
The Political leadership in Sarajevo had met in Mehurici to decide alternatives if Slovenia and Croatia should follow their stated plans to declare independence. After this board meeting Hasan Cengic met with Rusmir Mahmutcehajic to propose the formation of a paramilitary that would be an adjunct of SDA. Once approved by Alija Izetbegovic the first defense organization known as the "patriotic league" was formed. Another paramilitary known as the "green berets" would be formed from the people to help places where there where no defense organized by the local authority. As Bosnia declared independence the "territorial defense" was established as the state's official army and the patriotic league integrated a month later. The existence of other armed groups would lead the government to request the unification of all armed entities into one formation creating one official armed forces. This reform request would not last long as all other entities except the separatist ones would join finally establishing a centralized army. The newly reformed army would still be known as the "territorial defense" until July where the Army of the Republic of Bosnia and Herzegovina was officially established.

Paramilitaries and Defense Forces

Post-Centralization
The new army was divided into corps, each stationed in a particular territory. In 1993, most brigades were renamed as Mountain troops given that the lack of heavy weapons made it organizationally pointless to list them as infantry or motorized. In addition, Bosnian terrain favored light infantry over armored and mechanized formations. The special forces alongside the military police were controlled directly by the general staff of the army but that still didn't deny the formations of smaller spec-ops units and military police battalions to be formed in the corps independently or brigades specifically.

Army Corps and Independent Divisions

General Staff Units and Centers

Police Forces

Bosnian general staff

 Alija Izetbegović (the Supreme Commander of the Bosnian Armed Forces)
 Hasan Efendić (first commander of the Territorial Defence Force of the Republic of Bosnia and Herzegovina)
 Sefer Halilović (Chief of Staff of the Main Staff and Commander of the Bosnian Army, 1992–1993)
 Rasim Delić (Commander of Main Staff and Commander of the Bosnian Army, 1993–1995)
 Jovan Divjak (deputy of the ARBiH commander, 1992–1995)
 Stjepan Šiber (deputy of the ARBiH commander, 1992–1995)

Corps commanders
 Mustafa Hajrulahović Talijan (first commander of the 1st Corps)
 Vahid Karavelić (second commander of the 1st Corps)
 Nedžad Ajnadžić (third commander of the 1st Corps)
 Željko Knez (first commander of the 2nd Corps)
 Hazim Šadić (second commander of the 2nd Corps)
 Sead Delić (third commander of the 2nd Corps)
 Enver Hadžihasanović (first commander of the 3rd Corps)
 Mehmed Alagić (second commander of the 3rd Corps, first commander of the 7th corps)
 Kadir Jusić (third commander of the 3rd Corps)
 Sakib Mahmuljin (fourth commander of the 3rd Corps)
 Arif Pašalić (first commander of the 4th Corps)
 Sulejman Budaković "Tetak" (second commander of the 4th Corps)
 Ramiz Dreković (first commander of the 5th Corps, third commander of the 4th corps)
 Atif Dudaković (second commander of the 5th Corps)
 Salko Gušić (first commander of the 6th Corps)
 Galib Hodžić (second commander of the 6th Corps)
 Zaim Imamović (commander of the Easter Bosnian Operational Group)
 Blaž Kraljević (commander of HOS and member of the Bosnian Army Chiefs of Staff)
 Mustafa Polutak (fourth commander of the 4th Corps)
 Dino Aljić (Guard Brigade "Delta" and 117.Muslim Brigade commander)

Equipment

Infantry weapons of the Army of Bosnia and Herzegovina

Assault rifles and machine guns

Pistols

Infantry anti-tank weapons
{| class="wikitable"
! style="text-align: left;"|Name
! style="text-align: left;"|Origin
! style="text-align: left;"|Type
! style="text-align: left;"|Versions
! style="text-align: left;"|Notes
|-
| M80 Rocket Launcher
| 
| Rocket Launcher
|
|
|-
| M79 Osa
| 
| Rocket Launcher
|
|
|-
| AT-3 Sagger
| 
| Anit-tank missile
|
|
|-
| HJ-8
| 
| Anti-tank missile
| Baktar-Shikan, HJ-8E
| Was supplied to ARBiH in 1993-1995
by the Inter-Services Intelligence of

Pakistan
|-
| RPG-7
| 
| Rocket-propelled grenade
|
|
|
|
|
|

Artillery

Tanks

Armored personnel carriers

Self-propelled anti-aircraft artillery

Anti-aircraft artillery

Self-propelled artillery

References

External links
Ministry of Defense
Army of the Republic of Bosnia and Herzegovina 
Vojska.net
Armijabih.com

 
Military history of Bosnia and Herzegovina
Military units and formations established in 1992
Military units and formations disestablished in 1995
1992 establishments in Bosnia and Herzegovina
1995 disestablishments in Bosnia and Herzegovina